Argyrotaenia polvosana is a species of moth of the family Tortricidae. It is found in Chihuahua, Mexico.

The length of the forewings is about 8 mm. The forewings are ochreous, although the basal third of the costa and dorsum are slightly ferruginous. The hindwings are pale ochreous.

References

Moths described in 1961
polvosana
Moths of Central America